Tanglin Secondary School is a co-educational government secondary school in Clementi, Singapore.

History

Tanglin Technical Secondary School (1964 - 1993) 
Tanglin Secondary School which was located at 369 Commonwealth Avenue in the area called Tanglin Halt was officially opened by Education Minister Ong Pang Boon on 16 October 1964. It was Singapore’s first Chinese medium technical school, and the first institution to admit female students to technical courses. It was renamed Tanglin Technical Secondary School in 1969. The school motto was in Malay, “Berusaha Untok Berjaya”, of which translates to the same meaning as the current motto in English.

Tanglin Secondary School 
It was switched later to the Chinese medium pre-university classes, and renamed Tanglin Secondary School and relocated to the current premises at 301 West Coast Road in 1993.

Merger of Clementi Woods Secondary School 
In 2014, the Ministry of Education announced a merger of Clementi Woods Secondary School with Tanglin Secondary School, taking effect in 2016. This was taken into consideration of the critical student population of the two schools, that a merger will allow for more unitised resources for a more holistic education environment. The merged school retains the name and campus of Tanglin Secondary.

Merger into New Town Secondary School 
In 2021, the Ministry of Education announced Tanglin Secondary School will be merged into New Town Secondary School in 2023.

Special Programmes
 Bias for Engineering (Niche)
 Bias for Arts (Niche)
 Multimedia Digital Science Enrichment
 Y2Y Entrepreneur Incubation Programmes
 School Family Education
 BASICS Character Education
 School Exchange and Twinning Programme
 Music Education Programme for Secondary 1 and 2
 Dance Education for Secondary 1 and 2 boys and girls
 Environmental Education Programme
 Advanced Elective/Elective Module Programme(AEM/EM)
 Applied Graded Subject (AGS)

Notable alumni

 Cedric Foo: Member of Parliament
 Zainudin Nordin: Member of Parliament
 Mark Phooi: Entrepreneur
 Jayley Woo: Actress, Mediacorp
 Andie Chen: Actor, Mediacorp
 Sharil Ishak: Singapore Footballer

External links 
 
 Alumni webpage

Notes 

Secondary schools in Singapore
Educational institutions established in 1964
Clementi
1964 establishments in Singapore